Henry Peter Haun (January 18, 1815 – June 6, 1860) was a California Judge, farmer, and U.S. Senator from California. He was appointed by Governor John B. Weller to serve out Senator David C. Broderick's term following his predecessor's death in a duel.

Early life
Henry P. Haun was born on January 18, 1815 to John Haun and wife Katherine Winter Haun at Haun's Mill near Lexington, Kentucky. He graduated from Transylvania University and was admitted to the bar in 1839.

Personal life
On October 27, 1848, he married a cousin, Catherine Haun. They had two children, Kate (b. 1851) and David Rose (b. 1853).

Career
Haun was elected as the Prosecuting Attorney of Scott County, Kentucky. He then moved to Clinton County, Iowa to start a practice with his brother, W. G. Haun.

In 1846 he was elected as a delegate of the Iowa Constitutional Convention. In the spring of 1849, he traveled overland with his family during the California Gold Rush. They settled in Oroville, California in January 1850. He served as the first County Judge of Yuba County, California from 1851 to 1854.

On October 29, 1859, he was selected by Governor John B. Weller to fill the vacancy of David C. Broderick in the U.S. Senate. He served as senator from November 1859 to March 4, 1860. He was succeeded by Milton S. Latham.

Death
Haun died on June 6, 1860, in Marysville, California at age 45, several days after returning from Washington, D.C.

References

External links 
 Women's diaries of the westward journey / [collected by] Lillian Schlissel; preface by Carl N. Degler
 Haun Collection Archive . The Haun Collection archive spans more than 100 years in the life of the Haun family, from the Gold Rush to the Civil War to the early 20th century. The collection is housed at the Plumas County Museum in Quincy, CA.
 Personal Reminiscences of Early Days in California, with Other Sketches / by Stephen Johnson Field, George C. Gorham

1815 births
1860 deaths
Transylvania University alumni
Democratic Party United States senators from California
California Democrats
19th-century American politicians
People from Marysville, California
People from Scott County, Kentucky